TV PinGuim is a Brazilian animation studio founded in 1989 by Kiko Mistrorigo and Célia Catunda.

The company is known for the creation and development of targeted educational cartoons for children, making animation in 2D, 3D and stop-motion. The company began its career developing shorts for educational channels like TV Cultura, TV Escola and Canal Futura.

Notable creations 

 Fishtronaut
 Earth to Luna!
 Ping and Friends

Upcoming Lives 
 Gabriel Beleleu Live

References

External links 
 

Brazilian animation studios
Mass media companies established in 1989